Nettle Lake is an unincorporated community and census-designated place (CDP) in Williams County, Ohio, United States, around the south end of the lake of the same name. It was first listed as a CDP following the 2010 census.

The CDP is in the northwest corner of Ohio, in the northern part of Williams County's Northwest Township. Nettle Lake drains out of its northern end into Nettle Creek, which flows southeast to the St. Joseph River, a southwest-flowing major tributary of the Maumee River, which flows northeast to Lake Erie at Toledo.

Demographics

References 

Census-designated places in Williams County, Ohio
Census-designated places in Ohio